No Limite (English: On the Edge) is the Brazilian version of the international Survivor reality competition television franchise, itself derived from the Swedish television series Expedition Robinson created by Charlie Parsons which premiered in 1997.

No Limite was originally cancelled in 2001 after three seasons, due to the consistent ratings decline starting in season two. TV Globo would briefly revive the series for a fourth season in 2009. A follow-up season titled No Limite: Xtream was planned for 2010 but was ultimately scrapped. In 2021, the series was revived for a second time with actor André Marques as the new host and 16 returning housemates of Big Brother Brasil as contestants. After a lackluster performance, Marques was replaced by paracanoe athlete Fernando Fernandes on season six.

Format

The show basically follows the structure and all elements of the Survivor franchise, with some modifications. Contestants are split into two tribes, are taken to a remote isolated location and are forced to live off the land with meagre supplies for a period of several weeks. Frequent physical and mental challenges are used to pit the tribes against each other for rewards, such as food or luxuries, or for immunity, forcing the other tribe to attend Tribal Council, where they must vote one of their tribemates out of the game by secret ballot.

About halfway through the game, the tribes are merged into a single tribe, and challenges are on an individual basis; winning immunity prevents that player from being voted out.

The first three seasons feature "semi-finals" and "finals", and the final consisted of a great marathon of tests (physical and logical) involving elements used throughout the season.  The final result was revealed live (with the exception of the first season) by the presenter. In the fourth season, the first five eliminations were decided by public vote. And in the final, all the contestants eliminated after the merger began to compose a jury, which would decide the winner, through a live vote. In the fifth season eliminated two pairs of contestants at the final six, and the winner was decided by a public vote.

Series overview

Companion series
Since 2021, in addition to the main series, two companion shows are also produced for No Limite.

No Limite – A Eliminação
A spin-off series  titled No Limite – A Eliminação (No Limite – The Elimination) airs alongside the show on Multishow on Wednesday nights and on TV Globo on Sunday nights featuring a weekly re-cap episode and interview with the eliminated contestant.

Bate Papo No Limite
An online spin-off show titled Bate Papo No Limite (Chat No Limite) airs live immediately following the episodes on Gshow and Globoplay featuring exclusive content across social media sites and interviews hosted by Ana Clara Lima with the eliminated contestants and celebrity guests.

Ratings and reception

Brazilian ratings
All numbers are in points and provided by Kantar Ibope Media.

References

 
2000 Brazilian television series debuts
2000s Brazilian television series
2000s reality television series
2020s Brazilian television series
2020s reality television series
Brazilian reality television series
Television shows filmed in Brazil
Portuguese-language television shows
Rede Globo original programming
Television series revived after cancellation